The Fifth Settlement (literally means "the Fifth Gathering", but the official English name is "the Fifth Settlement";) is one of the districts of New Cairo, Egypt. It is one of the most affluent districts of the city. It consists of several private neighborhoods, including Gharb El Golf, El Shouifat, Diplomats, El Narges, North investors, South investor, etc... The main street is Share‘ El Tes‘een or 90 St., it serves as the central axis of the city of New Cairo. It contains financial, administrative and commercial centers that serve the city and Greater Cairo as a whole. It is one of the fastest-growing areas in Egypt in terms of construction.

History
Beginning on 5 March 2008, the criminal court of the Fifth Settlement was the venue of the trial of former Interior Minister Habib el-Adly for corruption, specifically money laundering and embezzlement of public funds.

Shopping areas in Fifth Settlement:
Cairo festival city mall, Downtown Katameya and Concord plaza.

See also 
 El Rehab
 New Cairo
 El Shorouk
 Greater Cairo

References

Districts of Cairo